The Battle of Andernach, between the followers and the opponents of King Otto I of Germany, took place on 2 October 939 in Andernach on the Rhine river and ended with a decisive defeat of the rebels and the death of their leaders.

Duke Eberhard of Franconia, a scion of the Conradine dynasty, had been a loyal supporter of the Liudolfing king Henry I of Germany (919–936). After the king's death however, he soon entered into conflict with his son and successor, Otto I, who did not see himself, as his father did, as primus inter pares. After Eberhard and other princes refused to pay homage to Otto in 937 his opponents joined Eberhard. In 938 he rebelled together with Otto’s elder half-brother Thankmar and the duke Eberhard of Bavaria. However, Thankmar was soon slain by Otto’s followers in the church of Eresburg (938), and Eberhard of Bavaria was replaced by his uncle Berthold. After a short reconciliation with Otto, Eberhard allied himself in 939 with Gilbert of Lorraine and Otto’s younger brother Henry of Bavaria to renew the rebellion. Gilbert, duke of Lorraine since 928, who had also been loyal during the rule of Henry I, now attempted to escape from his brother-in-law's sphere of influence and allied himself with the new king of the West Franks Louis IV, joining the revolt headed by Henry of Bavaria and Eberhard of Franconia.

King Otto achieved at first a victory over the rebels in a battle in Birten close to Xanten, although he could only pray and watch on the other side of the Rhine. Nonetheless he was not able to capture the conspirators. Meanwhile, Gilbert and Eberhard went to the south and devastated the areas of royalist counts. They received support from Louis IV, from Otto's brother-in-law Hugh the Great and other important West Frankish rulers. When Otto besieged Breisach, the insurgents advanced from Metz to the Rhine and crossed it by Andernach.

After the army went pillaging through the Niederlahngau, it started again to cross over the Rhine by Andernach. Gilbert and Eberhard were surprised by the two royalist counts,  Konrad Kurzbold, count of Niederlahngau, and his cousin Udo, count of Wetterau and Rheingau. Although the Conradines and the cousins of Eberhard stood both on Otto's side, they followed the rebels with a small army and attacked only when the majority of the opposing army had already set with its booty over the Rhine. Eberhard was slain in the fight and Gilbert drowned in the Rhine when he attempted to escape to the other side. Thus ended the rebellion against Otto I.

References 

939
Andernach
Andernach
History of the Rhineland
Andernach
10th century in East Francia
10th century in Germany